Bathnaha Assembly constituency is an assembly constituency in Sitamarhi district in the Indian state of Bihar. It is reserved for scheduled castes. It was an open seat earlier.

Overview
As per Delimitation of Parliamentary and Assembly constituencies Order, 2008, 24. Bathnaha Assembly constituency (SC) is composed of the following: Bathnaha and Majorganj community development blocks; Bagha, Khap Khopraha, Marpa, Kanhauli, Kachor, Bhutahi, Madhesra, Ghurghura, Hanuman Nagar and Bishanpur Gonahi gram panchayats of Sonbarsha CD Block.

Bathnaha Assembly constituency is part of 5. Sitamarhi (Lok Sabha constituency).

Members of Legislative Assembly

Election results

2020

References

External links
 

Assembly constituencies of Bihar
Politics of Sitamarhi district